Malcolm Douglas Cooper, MBE, (20 December 1947 – 9 June 2001) was a British sport shooter and founder of Accuracy International.

Sports shooting career
He was the first shooter to win two consecutive gold medals in the Olympic 50 metre rifle three positions event, a feat which stood unrivalled for 28 years until the 2016 Rio Olympics, when Italian shooter Niccolò Campriani matched the record by successfully defending his three position title from the 2012 London Olympics. He won gold medals at the 1984 Summer Olympics in Los Angeles and at the 1988 Summer Olympics in Seoul (both in the three positions event). In 1986 he was also world champion in 300 m Standard Rifle, a non-Olympic rifle discipline in which he claimed several European and World titles, as well as holding the World record for a period.

Cooper won twelve Commonwealth Games medals; four gold medals, five silver medals and three bronze medals and represented England at four Games from 1974 until 1990.

Personal life
Cooper was born in 1947 in Camberley and learned to shoot whilst attending the Royal Hospital School at Holbrook in Suffolk, UK before his family moved to New Zealand where he attended Westlake Boys High School and learned the art of shooting small bore rifles. His father, who was in the Royal Navy was drafted there:  He started shooting competitively in 1970. In 1978 he co-founded rifle making company Accuracy International. He married Sarah Robinson in 1974.

Cooper died in June 2001 after an eight-month battle with cancer. He died at his home in Eastergate, West Sussex.

References

External links

The Telegraph: Obituary

1947 births
2001 deaths
Olympic shooters of Great Britain
British male sport shooters
ISSF rifle shooters
Shooters at the 1972 Summer Olympics
Shooters at the 1976 Summer Olympics
Shooters at the 1984 Summer Olympics
Shooters at the 1988 Summer Olympics
English Olympic medallists
Olympic gold medallists for Great Britain
People from Camberley
People educated at Westlake Boys High School
Olympic medalists in shooting
People educated at the Royal Hospital School
Medalists at the 1984 Summer Olympics
Medalists at the 1988 Summer Olympics
Shooters at the 1974 British Commonwealth Games
Shooters at the 1982 Commonwealth Games
Shooters at the 1986 Commonwealth Games
Shooters at the 1990 Commonwealth Games
Commonwealth Games medallists in shooting
Commonwealth Games gold medallists for England
Commonwealth Games silver medallists for England
Commonwealth Games bronze medallists for England
20th-century English businesspeople
Medallists at the 1982 Commonwealth Games
Medallists at the 1986 Commonwealth Games
Medallists at the 1990 Commonwealth Games